The following radio stations broadcast on AM frequency 1180 kHz: 1180 AM is United States clear-channel frequency; Class A status is held by WHAM in Rochester, New York.

1180 AM is the frequency used by Radio Martí, reportedly operating with 100,000 watts from a transmitter in Marathon in the Florida Keys.  Because it is owned and operated by the U.S. Broadcasting Board of Governors, Radio Martí is not licensed by the Federal Communications Commission, and has no call letters.  It is subject to jamming from Cuba where its directional antenna is pointed.  As a consequence, other stations on 1180 in North America may experience interference at night from the jamming stations of Cuba.

In Argentina
 LRI230 De La Sierra in Tandil, Buenos Aires

In Cuba
 CMGW in Santo Spiritus
 CMJL in Mayarí Arriba

In Mexico
 XEFR-AM in Mexico, DF
 XEUBS-AM in La Paz, Baja California Sur

In the United States
Stations in bold are clear-channel stations.

References

Lists of radio stations by frequency